Ntabankulu, alternatively rendered as Tabankulu, is a town in Alfred Nzo District Municipality in the Eastern Cape province of South Africa.

Village some 30 km east-south-east of Mount Frere and 50 km south-south-west of Kokstad. Of Xhosa origin, the name means 'large mountain'. The village was laid out in 1894.

References

Populated places in the Ntabankulu Local Municipality